Dossa and Joe is a 2002, bittersweet television comedy series, created, and co-written by Caroline Aherne of the Royle Family. Peter Herbert served as co-writer.

Made by Granada Australia, for the BBC, the Sydney-based series centres on a working class couple called Dossa and Joe. When Joe retires from his job as a factory worker, the couple realizes they know little about each other despite being married 40 years. Against Joe's wishes, the couple begins marriage counseling.

The series starred Anne Charleston as Dossa and Michael Caton as Joe. The cast also included Jeanie Drynan and Roy Billing. 

While the series received positive reviews, there were some dissenters. The series failed to earn good ratings and was not renewed for a second series.

References

2002 Australian television series debuts
2002 Australian television series endings
Australian comedy television series
BBC Television shows
2002 British television series debuts
2002 British television series endings
English-language television shows